Line 10 is a southwest–northeast line of the Shanghai Metro network. It officially opened for service on April 10, 2010. It has been given the unofficial nickname “Golden Line” as it links many of the city's tourist attractions like Yuyuan and Xintiandi. It connects the Hongqiao International Airport with the downtown core of Shanghai, and also the dense residential districts of Yangpu and Hongkou. It is the only line in the system with numbered station codes. It is the first high-density and high-volume fully automatic subway line in Mainland China, operating with GoA4 unattended train operation. The line is colored lilac on system maps.

History
The first phase opened on 10 April 2010 and extended on 30 November 2010.

Construction accident
There have been a number accidents during the construction of Line 10 but none lead to reported deaths or major injuries. On April 20, 2007, a crane on the  construction site collapsed into a five-story building causing some external damage. On June 25, 2008, during tunnel boring between Liyang Road and Quyang Road, a blowout occurred letting water and sand enter the tunnel and create minor sinkholes nearby. No deaths were caused by this incident, as the workers were all evacuated in time. On January 6, 2010, a crane at  suddenly lost control during operation, causing a 5-meter-long boom to crash on the roofs of two construction vehicles.

Stations

Service routes

Important stations
 - located within Hongqiao Railway Station, interchange with lines 2 and 17.
 - located within Hongqiao International Airport, interchange with line 2 (Shanghai Public Transport Card required).
 - Located near the Shanghai Zoo in Changning District.
 - Interchange with lines 1 and 12.
 - Located in the Xintiandi shopping area. Interchange with line 13
 - Interchange with line 8.
 - Located near the famous Yuyuan Garden. Interchange with line 14
 - Located under the pedestrianised Nanjing Road and close to The Bund. Interchange with line 2.
 station - Located near the Tongji University.

Station name change

Headways 
Technology

Signalling
Line 10 is one of the first lines in China capable of automatic train operation. However, upon opening it was operated with drivers on board. In 2020, the line started transitioning into GoA4 unattended train operation with driver cabs being gradually removed for the entire Line 10 fleet.

Between December 2020 and January 2021, SATEE supplied its OptONIX and ONIX metro traction systems for 156 metro cars of Shanghai Line 10, with support from Xi'an Alstom Yongji Electric Equipment Co. Ltd (XAYEECO). It was also responsible for the train control monitoring system (TCMS) of Shanghai Line 10, and the line's train electrical design. During the same period, CASCO has successfully put into service its Urbalis 888 signalling solution on six of these metro lines in Chengdu and Shanghai.

Rolling stock

References

Shanghai Metro lines
2010 establishments in China
Shanghai Metro
 
Airport rail links in China
Automated guideway transit